The Iceland national youth handball team is the national under-19 handball team of Iceland. Controlled by the Icelandic Handball Association, it represents Iceland in international matches. In 2015, it finished 2nd in the 2009 Men's Youth World Handball Championship and 3rd in the 2015 Men's Youth World Handball Championship.

Statistics

Youth Olympic Games 

 Champions   Runners up   Third place   Fourth place

World Championship record
 Champions   Runners up   Third place   Fourth place

EHF European Youth Championship 
 Champions   Runners up   Third place   Fourth place

References

External links
World Men's Youth Championship table
European Men's Youth Championship table

Handball in Iceland
Men's national youth handball teams
Handball